http://mechwarrior3.org/

The ninth season of Indonesian Idol premiered on RCTI at the end of 2017 after a three-year hiatus. Registration opened 21 August. The main audition process was held in five major cities in Indonesia: Bandung, Yogyakarta, Surabaya, Medan and Jakarta.

This season was won by the youngest contestant from the history of Indonesian Idol, at 16 year-old, Maria Simorangkir, from Medan, North Sumatra with Ahmad Abdul as the runner-up.

Hiatus  
After the 10th anniversary of Indonesian Idol broadcasts, the show was replaced with The Voice Indonesia for the second season on RCTI, since the broadcast on Indosiar could not be extended and preferred to focus on the Dangdut contest. In the final year, FremantleMedia presented a new breakthrough singing contest, namely Just Duet, created alongside NET. However, as both events had decreased ratings, RCTI and FremantleMedia brought back Indonesian Idol for the ninth season.

Hosts and judges

Host 
 Daniel Mananta

Judges  
The judges were:
 Ari Lasso
 Armand Maulana
 Bunga Citra Lestari
 Judika
 Maia Estianty

Schedule auditions

Regional auditions

Terms contestants: Contestants must be 16–27 years old and lived in Indonesia

Special city auditions
In addition to big cities, Indonesian Idol also held auditions in several cities in Indonesia to move to the main audition (regional audition):

 Kupang
 Makassar
 Manado
 Malang
 Palembang
 Semarang
 Ambon
 Padang
 Purwokerto
 Banjarmasin
 Cirebon
 Balikpapan
 Sukabumi

Elimination round
Held at the Studio 4 of RCTI for the third straight year, the first day of the elimination round featured the 113 contestants from the auditions round singing solo a cappella. 50 contestants advanced. The next round required the contestants to split up into 10 groups and perform. 26 of them advanced to the finals of the elimination round requiring a solo performance with a full band. 20 of them made it to the Top 20 show where the judges take contestants one by one and tell them if they made the final 20.

Semi-finalist

The following is a list of Top 20 semi-finalists who failed to reach the finals:

Finalist

The following is the list of Top 20 semi-finalists who succeed to reach the finals:

Semi-finals

Showcase Round
The top 20 Show was divided into two nights and aired live on 15 and 16 January 2018 at 9:00 p.m. The contestants performed songs of their choice (there was no particular theme) with twelve contestants performed on the first night, and the other performed on the second night along with the result. Ten contestants with most vote advanced automatically to the Spectacular Show, and then each judges would pick one contestant left to compete along the Top 10. There were 20 semi-finalists, twelve females and eight males.

Showcase Round Night 1

Showcase Round Night 2

Top 15 Show
The Semifinalists once again took the stage to compete the 12 tickets to the Spectacular Show. The one night show took place on 22 January 2018 at 9:00pm (UTC−5 9:00am) live. The Top 15 contestants performed the songs of their choice and no particular theme introduced yet. Ten contestants with the most votes advanced to the Spectacular Show along with two contestants chosen by judges as a wildcard contestants.

Finals

Top 12 - Indonesian Idols

Top 11 - Expect the Unexpected / Audition Songs

Top 10 - Solo / Duet
For the first time in the Spectacular Show, all the finalists took a solo and duet performance with other finalist.

Guest performer(s): Anne-Marie ("Rockabye" & "Friends")

Top 9 - This Is Me
Due to Miss Indonesia 2018 final night on Friday, February 23 that held on the same studio as Indonesian Idol this season, the Top 9 finalists only sang one time on Monday show and there wasn't Tuesday show as usual. The results was also announced at the end of the Monday show.

Top 8 - Songs About Love

Top 7 - Original Soundtrack 

Guest performer(s): Shane Filan ("Need You Now" with Top 7 finalists & "Heaven")

Top 6 - Songs from 21st Century

Guest performer(s): Jonatan Cerrada ("Lelaki Lain di Hati")

Top 5 - Millenial Collaborations / Sing For Your Life
Each contestants sang one solo and one EDM duet with young Indonesian music producers / composers.

Top 4 - Judges Collaborations / Top of the Charts
Each contestant will perform one hit song and one duet with the judges. Ahmad Abdul paired with Bunga Citra Lestari, Ayu Putrisundari paired with Ari Lasso, Joanita Veroni with Armand Maulana, and Maria Simorangkir got to sing with Judika.

Guest Performer(s): Rossa ("Pernah Memiliki" & "Terlalu Cinta" with Top 4 finalists)

Top 3 (first week) - Superstar Duet / Contestant's Choice
The finalists will have to do a duet one more time, but right now they paired with Indonesian superstar, Yura for Ahmad Abdul, Krisdayanti for Joanita Veroni, and Kotak for Maria Simorangkir. There wasn't any elimination this week, instead, the Top 3 will have to sing one more time next week during "Road to Grand Finale".

Group Performance: "Pesta" (Top 3 finalists)
Guest Performer(s): Kotak ("Mati Rasa")

Top 3 (second week) - Road to Grand Finale
The contestants each sang one song that represents their type of music they want to take in their careers, and one duet with Indonesian newcomer, Rizky Febian. 

Group Performance: "Feels" (Rizky Febian with Top 3 finalists)
Guest Performer(s): The Script ("Superheroes", "Breakeven", "The Man Who Can't Be Moved" and "Hall of Fame")

Grand Finale - Ballad / Yovie's Songbook / Jevin's Collaborations / Winning Song
The finalists each sang one ballad song that represents their personality, one duet with Indonesian composer / producer, Yovie Widianto, one EDM duet with Indonesian newcomer producer / beatboxer, Jevin Julian, and each finalist's winning song.

Group Performance: 
"Idola Indonesia" (Maria & Abdul feat. Indonesian Idol All Stars)
"Rise" (Maria & Abdul)
Guest Performer(s):
"Kemenangan Hati" (Ihsan Tarore, Rini Wulandari, Citra Scholastika, Regina Ivanova, Nowela Auparay feat. Yovie Widianto)
"And I'm Telling You I'm Not Going" (Regina Ivanova)
"Because You Loved Me" (Rini Wulandari)
"Wrecking Ball" (Nowela Auparay)
"Menghujam Jantungku" (Citra Scholastika)
"Bento" (Ihsan Tarore)
"Ekspresi" (Nowela Auparay, Regina Ivanova, Citra Scholastika, Rini Wulandari, dan Ihsan Tarore)
"You Don't Have To Go" (Citra Scholastika)

Result and Reunion - Finalist's Favourite / Legends' Mashups
The finalists each sang one of their favourite song in their life, and one duet with Indonesian legendary singers, Glenn Fredly and Sandhy Sondoro. People voted based on last week's performances (Grand Finale) and these performances.

Group Performance: 
"Karena Cinta" (Glenn Fredly feat. Top 10 Indonesian Idol)
"Idola Indonesia" (Top 12 Indonesian Idol)
Guest Performer(s):
"Sayang" (Kevin Aprilio & Via Vallen)
"Firasat" (Via Vallen)
"Haruskah Ku Mati" (Ayu Putrisundari & Donnie Sibarani)
"Cinta Kan Membawamu Kembali" (Glen Samuel & Reza Artamevia)
"Kau" (Mona Magang, Withney Julinetha, Joanita Veroni & Saykoji)
"Dekat Di Hati" (Marion Jola & RAN)
"That's What I Like" (Marion Jola)
"Adam Hawa" (Chandra Wahyudi & Armada)
"Asal Kau Bahagia" (Ghea Indrawari, Bianca Jodie & Armada)

Elimination chart

Sponsor
 Grab
 Opera Mini
 Vivo Smart Phone

References

External links
 

Indonesian Idol
2017 Indonesian television seasons
2018 Indonesian television seasons